Campina can refer to:
Câmpina, a Romanian city.
Campina, a Dutch dairy company merged with Royal Friesland foods. The name of the new company is FrieslandCampina.
Campina GmbH, a German subsidiary of the Dutch dairy cooperative FrieslandCampina
Campina (biome), natural or artificial meadows in Brazil
Campinarana, open shrubland and savanna in the north of Brazil and in Colombia and Venezuela
Campina (ice cream), an ice cream products company in Indonesia

See also
Campinas, a city and county located in the state of São Paulo, Brazil.
Campino (disambiguation)